Mario Trejo may refer to:
 Mario Trejo (writer), Argentine poet, playwright, screenwriter, and journalist
 Mario Trejo (footballer, born 1956), Mexican footballer
 Mario Trejo (footballer, born 1999), Mexican footballer